Shaquille Riddick (born March 12, 1993) is an American football outside linebacker who is currently a member of the Edmonton Elks. He played college football at Gardner–Webb University, then transferred to West Virginia.

Professional career

Arizona Cardinals
Riddick was drafted by the Cardinals in the fifth round, 158th overall, in the 2015 NFL Draft. On September 3, 2016, Riddick was released by the Cardinals. The next day, he was signed to the Cardinals' practice squad. He was released on September 27, 2016.

Pittsburgh Steelers
On December 13, 2016, Riddick was signed to the Steelers' practice squad.

References

External links
 
 West Virginia Mountaineers bio
 
 

1993 births
Living people
American football defensive ends
American football linebackers
Arizona Cardinals players
Gardner–Webb Runnin' Bulldogs football players
Pittsburgh Steelers players
Players of American football from Akron, Ohio
West Virginia Mountaineers football players